Night of Truth is a 2004 French/Burkinabe film, the first full-length film by director Fanta Régina Nacro. Set in a fictional West-African country, this film tells the story of the night of reconciliation between two ethnic groups, the Nayak and the Bonandés. After ten years of war and much bloodshed, Théo, leader of the Bonandés, invites the Nayak president to come and make peace. However, things do not go as smoothly as planned. The film is in French and Dioula.

External links
 
 Night of Truth on africine.org

2004 films
2000s French-language films
Dioula-language films
Films set in Africa
2004 drama films